Marie-Thérèse Nlandu Mpolo Nene is a Congolese politician and first female chief of staff of her country.

Biography
She is the daughter of Jean Nlandu di Nsenda (brother of Edmond Nzeza Nlandu) and Louise Mpolo. Mari-Thérèse Nlandu is married to Professor Noël Mbala Nkondi, and is a mother of 4 children. In 1982 she became a lawyer at the Kinshasa / Gombe Court of Appeal, and later became Legal Counsel for the Presidency of the Republic under the tenure of Mobutu Sese Seko. She became the first female chief of staff of the prime minister, under Nguza Karl-i-Bond. As a lawyer, Nlandu has pleaded many important cases in the Democratic Republic of Congo. On March 22, 2006, she officially presented herself as candidate of the Parti pour la Paix au Congo party to the president for the Congolese presidential election of July 2006. Wivine N'Landu Kavidi, a member of her family, also ran for the Union for the Defense of the Republic (UDR) party.

In November 2006, Nlandu defended an appeal lodged by Jean-Pierre Bemba before the Supreme Court of Justice against the provisional results giving Joseph Kabila, the outgoing president, the lead in the second round of voting. On November 20, she was arrested and imprisoned for inciting violence among followers and "alleged insurrectionary movement and the illegal possession of firearms". At the trial in April 2007, the prosecutor ruled for her to be given 20 years in prison for her charges of insurrection and military ammunition possession.

References

21st-century Democratic Republic of the Congo women politicians
21st-century Democratic Republic of the Congo politicians